Sverdlovo, called Ylä-Somme before 1948 and Novoselye in 1948–1949, is a rural locality on Karelian Isthmus, in Vyborgsky District of Leningrad Oblast.

Rural localities in Leningrad Oblast
Karelian Isthmus